San Alfonso Airport was a rural airstrip  west of Alhué, a town in the Santiago Metropolitan Region of Chile.

Google Earth Historical Imagery (9/11/2014) shows a  grass runway. The (3/18/2016) and subsequent imagery show the runway plowed and cropped.

See also

Transport in Chile
List of airports in Chile

References

External links
OpenStreetMap - San Alfonso

Defunct airports
Airports in Santiago Metropolitan Region